Shaha Riza (born 1953 or 1954), is a Libyan former World Bank employee. Her external assignment at the Foundation for the Future, a "semi-independent foundation to promote democracy" is both in the Middle East and in North Africa.

Early life
Riza was born a British national in Tripoli to a Libyan-Turkish father and Syrian-Saudi mother. She grew up in Libya but attended a Catholic boarding school in England. Her father, Khalid Alwalid Algargany, was a consultant of King Abdul Aziz of Saudi Arabia, King Saud and King Faisal.

Adulthood 
She was educated at the London School of Economics, from which she received her bachelor's degree, and at St Antony's College, Oxford, from which she earned a master's degree in international relations in 1983. During the late 1980s, she relocated to the United States and married Bulent Ali Riza, with whom she had a son. The marriage later ended in divorce. She speaks Arabic, Turkish, English, French and Italian.

Career

National Endowment for Democracy 
At the National Endowment for Democracy she set up and led the endowment's Middle East programs, specializing in Middle East politics and economics field research.

U.S. Department of State 
Here she was employed in the office of Elizabeth Cheney, subordinated to  C. David Welch Assistant Secretary of State for Near Eastern Affairs.  Whilst there she began to spend time at the Foundation for the Future.

World Bank 
Beginning as a consultant in July 1997 and then full-time in 1999, she worked with the Middle East and North Africa Social and Economic Development Group of the World Bank. First as a Senior Gender Specialist and then as a Senior Communications Officer, she was seated in the Middle East and North Africa Regional Office (MENA). By July 2002, she was acting manager for external affairs and outreach for MENA, but resigned after Paul Wolfowitz took leadership as World Bank president.

Freelance work 
In 2004,  Riza organized a major conference of North African and Middle Eastern groups in Beirut. Her goal was to inspire democratic reforms in the aftermath of the fall of Saddam Hussein as she felt planting democracy in Iraq will inspire other regimes to democratic goals. Riza is reportedly earns $180,000 salary after taxes in 2008, and works from home.

World Bank controversy 

Riza did not report to the World Bank president, Paul Wolfowitz while at the World Bank. Riza was romantically linked to Wolfowitz prior to his World Bank involvement, when he was Deputy Secretary of Defence under Donald Rumsfeld in the Bush Administration. In 2005 Wolfowitz offered to sign a statement to isolate himself from her  which only served to draw scrutiny to what grew into a perceived conflict of interest. The World Bank ethics committee rejected Wolfowitz's proposal after Wolfowitz refused to include recusal from professional contact with Riza in the proposal.

Subsequently, Paul Wolfowitz was alleged to have involved himself in Riza's career by personally increasing her pay. This was a potential impropriety. Instead, Riza was asked to leave the World Bank altogether. She even gave up a promotion for which she was highly recommended. By 2007, the Board of the World Bank accepted that Paul Wolfowitz acted ethically. Still, Wolfowitz resigned by June of that year.

In retrospect, staffing policy was to the contrary. Rule 4.01, paragraph 5.2, states that spouses and registered domestic partners are barred from working in situations where "one supervises the other directly or indirectly", but informal relationships fall under rule 3.01, paragraph 4.02, which states that in such cases, as Wolfowitz and Riza's relationship, the supervisor "shall be responsible for seeking a resolution of the conflict of interest."

In 2007, Riza released an internal statement which she had submitted as part of a defence to her employers to The Wall Street Journal as follows:

Public outcry 
Prominent newspapers, among them The Financial Times and The Wall Street Journal condemned the fates of Wolfowitz and Riza. Christopher Hitchens described the removal of Riza and Wolfowitz as "character assassination." He surmised that this was all due to personal conflict between the U.S. and European branches at the World Bank. Further, he surmised that this was retribution for Wolfowitz's support of the Iraq war.

Robert Holland maintained that Wolfowitz's resignation has nothing to do with Riza's promotion. Holland served on the bank's board of directors until 2006. Sari Nusseibeh wrote an open letter to the Washington Post on April 30, 2007 about this "unfair and vicious campaign." Andrew Young describes Riza as "an admired World Bank professional and a champion of human rights." Sandra Day O'Connor a board member at the Foundation for the Future, describes Riza as "a very competent person." Even Clare Selgin Wolfowitz praises Riza, "Shaha Riza is a dedicated and serious reform advocate who has my respect."

On April 17, 2007, the editorial page of The Wall Street Journal published an op-ed that characterized the scandal as a witch hunt.  
The New York Times called for Wolfowitz's resignation on April 28, 2007.

World Bank stance 
Wolfowitz was confirmed as president in June 2005. According to a World Bank Ethics Committee Case report, Wolfowitz acknowledged  his association with Riza and stated that "...during the negotiations of my contract, to avoid any appearance of a conflict of interest, I provided a statement to the Board recusing myself from any personnel actions or decisions with respect to a longstanding professional staff member of the Bank with whom it has been reported that I have a prior personal relationship." The committee proposed a recommendation of "mutually agreed separation."

Autobiography and publication list 
 Worldbank Group Staff Connections 2005 (PDF)
 Worldbank Group Communications

References

External links
Articles, publications and reports (items not related to Wolfowitz matter)
"For Shaha Riza, a Feminist Fight", by Mary Lu Carnevale, The Wall Street Journal’s Capital Bureau, April 30, 2007.
Transcript of appearance on The McLaughlin Group talk show, 24 July 2002
World Bank photo of Shaha Riza
What Will the Neighbors Say? Wolfowitz Romance Stirs Gossip Richard Leiby, Washington Post, 22 March 2005
Pressure grows on World Bank Boss BBC News, 13 April 2007
The Purging of Paul Wolfowitz: An absurd non-scandal might cost the World Bank president his job Michael Weiss, Jewcy, May 9, 2007
 Worldbankpresident.org blog on the Wolfowitz affair
A Brave Woman Scorned Christopher Hitchens, Slate, May 14, 2007

1950s births
Living people
People from Tripoli, Libya
Libyan people of Turkish descent
Libyan people of Saudi Arabian descent
Libyan people of Syrian descent
Alumni of St Antony's College, Oxford
Alumni of the London School of Economics
English people of Libyan descent
English people of Turkish descent
English people of Syrian descent
English people of Saudi Arabian descent
World Bank people
United States Department of State officials